Lowell Joint School District is a public school district in Los Angeles County, California, United States. The district serves the eastern portion of Whittier, La Habra Heights and a portion of La Habra and the unincorporated community of East Whittier. The school district serves as a feeder district for Fullerton Joint Union High School District.

References

External links
 

School districts in Los Angeles County, California